Brain-specific angiogenesis inhibitors are G-protein coupled receptors belonging to the class B secretin subfamily.  Members include:

 Brain-specific angiogenesis inhibitor 1
 Brain-specific angiogenesis inhibitor 2
 Brain-specific angiogenesis inhibitor 3

References

External links
 
 
 

G protein-coupled receptors